Edmonton—Leduc was a federal electoral district in Alberta, Canada, that was represented in the House of Commons of Canada from 2004 to 2015. As a result of changes to the Electoral Boundaries Readjustment Act, based on the 2011 census, the number of seats in the House of Commons of Canada increased from 308 to 338. Alberta's seat count increased from 28 to 34. The riding was redistributed into the new ridings of Edmonton Riverbend and Edmonton—Wetaskiwin.

Geography
The district includes a southwestern portion of Edmonton, the Town of Devon and the City of Leduc and its vicinity.

History
The electoral district was created in 2003 as a result of the creation of two extra Alberta seats. It is composed from the following previous ridings: 55.5% from Edmonton Southwest, 20.9% from Edmonton—Strathcona and 23.6% from Wetaskiwin.

Member of Parliament

This riding has elected the following Member of Parliament:

Most Recent Member of Parliament
Its last sitting Member of Parliament was James Rajotte, a former executive assistant. He was first elected to Parliament in the 2000 election. He is a member of the Conservative Party of Canada.

Elections results

See also
 List of Canadian federal electoral districts
 Past Canadian electoral districts

References

Notes

External links
 
 Expenditures - 2008
 Expenditures - 2004
 Website of the Parliament of Canada

Former federal electoral districts of Alberta
Leduc, Alberta
Politics of Edmonton